Ajdin Mulalić (born 13 September 1994) is a Bosnian footballer who plays as a goalkeeper for Slovenian PrvaLiga side Domžale.

References

External links
 

1994 births
Living people
People from Bužim
Bosnia and Herzegovina footballers
Association football goalkeepers
NK Domžale players
ND Ilirija 1911 players
Slovenian Second League players
Slovenian PrvaLiga players
Bosnia and Herzegovina expatriate footballers
Expatriate footballers in Slovenia
Bosnia and Herzegovina expatriate sportspeople in Slovenia